Claire Brady is an Irish short distance runner.

Brady was born in Kildare and represents Celbridge Athletic Club in domestic competitions. She represented Dublin City University at college level, winning two indoor gold medals at 60 metres, one outdoor 100 metres gold, two outdoor gold medals at 200m and one gold at the 4 x 100 metres relay, setting a new Irish university record.

Brady represented Ireland at the 2009 European Athletics U23 Championships in the 100 metres but failed to win a medal. She qualified for the 2010 IAAF World Indoor Championships in Doha, Qatar at the Women's 60 metres, advancing past the heats in 7.43 seconds. The semi-finals & final took place on 14 March 2010.

References
college athletics records

Living people
Athletes from the Republic of Ireland
Year of birth missing (living people)
Sportspeople from County Kildare
Alumni of Dublin City University